Ryan Williams (born June 1, 1973) is an American politician and a Republican member of the Tennessee House of Representatives representing District 42 since January 2011. In 2016, he was elected by his colleagues to serve as the Republican Caucus Chairman.

Biography
Williams was born in Kingsport, Tennessee, and was a native of Blountville also with Sullivan County, Tennessee where he graduated from Sullivan Central High School.

Willaims earned his BS in biology from Carson–Newman College (now Carson–Newman University). While in attendance, he was a stand-out athlete on the University's Division II Men's Soccer team.

Elections
In 2016, Williams ran unopposed in the August 4, 2016 Republican Primary and won the November 7, 2016 General Election with 17,486 votes (74.50%) against Democratic nominee Amos Powers.
In 2014, Williams was unopposed for the August 7, 2014 Republican Primary and won the November 4, 2014 General election with 10,054 votes (71.8%) against Democratic nominee Mike Walsh. 
In 2012, Williams was unopposed for the August 2, 2012 Republican Primary, winning with 4,772 votes, and won the November 6, 2012 General election with 15,049 votes (71.4%) against Democratic nominee Thomas Willoughby.
In 2010, Williams challenged District 42 incumbent Democratic Representative Henry Fincher. Williams ran in the August 5, 2010 Republican Primary, winning with 3,941 votes (71.0%), and won the November 2, 2010 General election with 9,222 votes (55.3%) against Representative Fincher.

References

External links
Official page at the Tennessee General Assembly

Ryan Williams at Ballotpedia
Ryan Williams at OpenSecrets

1973 births
Living people
Carson–Newman University alumni
Republican Party members of the Tennessee House of Representatives
People from Cookeville, Tennessee
People from Kingsport, Tennessee
21st-century American politicians